Kyle is an unincorporated community in Manchester Township, Dearborn County, Indiana.

History
A post office was established at Kyle in 1883, and remained in operation until it was discontinued in 1904.

Geography

References

Unincorporated communities in Dearborn County, Indiana
Unincorporated communities in Indiana